The AfriCat Foundation is a Namibian organisation promoting the conservation of large carnivores.

Background
In 1991, the AfriCat Foundation was registered as a non-profit organization to raise finds for the care of large carnivores.

References

External links 
 Official site

This article is based on information from the equivalent article on the German Wikipedia.

Foundations based in Namibia
1991 establishments in Namibia
Cat conservation organizations
Animal welfare organisations based in Namibia